Anna Mouglalis (born 26 April 1978) is a French actress and model. She is known for being a house ambassador for Chanel since 2002, and for portraying the fashion designer Coco Chanel in the 2009 film Coco Chanel & Igor Stravinsky, and actress Paula Maxa in the 2018 film The Most Assassinated Woman in the World.

Life and career
Mouglalis was born in Fréjus, Var, to a French mother and a Greek father. She spent her youth in the Var département, before moving back to Nantes with her family. Her father is a doctor and her mother is a physical therapist.

Until 2001 Mouglalis studied at the Conservatoire National Supérieur d'Art Dramatique de Paris (CNSAD) under the direction of Daniel Mesguich. In addition to her native French, she speaks fluent English, Italian, and Spanish, and understands Greek to a limited extent.

In 1997, she had begun an acting career in La Nuit du Titanic, played in Paris. In the same year she was chosen by Francis Girod for the film Terminal. In 2000 she co-starred with Isabelle Huppert in Claude Chabrol's Merci pour le chocolat. After appearing in Novo (2002) by Jean Pierre Limosin, she was cast by Roberto Andò for the thriller Sotto falso nome. In 2003, she played in La Maladie de la mort, a film in black and white by first-time director Asa Mader, which previewed at the Venice Film Festival. In this same year, she co-starred in a Greek film, called Real Life (Alithini Zoi), directed by Panos Koutras. In 2005 she took part in two Italian movies: Romanzo criminale, directed by Michele Placido, and Mare buio, where she was featured alongside Luigi Lo Cascio.

In a TV movie called Les Amants du Flore and directed by Ilan Duran Cohen, Mouglalis played Simone de Beauvoir, with Jean-Paul Sartre played by co-star Lorànt Deutsch. Together they had a great public and critical triumph. Critics praised their portrayals of these literary figures, showing their romance and the birth of their careers.

Along with her career as an actress, Mouglalis began a successful modelling career. In 2002 she was chosen by Karl Lagerfeld for the ad campaign for the Amateur Allure de Chanel perfume. He used her as one of his "muses," promoting Chanel bags, fine jewelry, and watches.

Mouglalis was cast as Coco Chanel in the 2009 film Coco Chanel & Igor Stravinsky, directed by Jan Kounen. The film was chosen to close the 2009 Cannes Film Festival.

In 2018, she portrayed French actress Paula Maxa in the Netflix film The Most Assassinated Woman in the World.

Personal life
On 7 March 2007, she gave birth to her first child, a daughter named Saul, whom she had with French director Samuel Benchetrit.

Filmography

Actress

Director / Writer

Theater

References

External links

 

French female models
French film actresses
French television actresses
French stage actresses
People from Fréjus
1978 births
Living people
French people of Greek descent
20th-century French actresses
21st-century French actresses
French National Academy of Dramatic Arts alumni